The 1908 United States presidential election in Maine took place on November 3, 1908, as part of the 1908 United States presidential election. Voters chose six representatives, or electors to the Electoral College, who voted for president and vice president.

Maine voted for the Republican nominee, Secretary of War William Howard Taft, over the Democratic nominee, former U.S. Representative William Jennings Bryan. Taft won the state by a margin of 29.71%.

With 63% of the popular vote, Maine would be Taft's second strongest victory in terms of percentage in the popular vote after nearby Vermont.

Results

Results by county

See also
 United States presidential elections in Maine

References

Maine
1908
1908 Maine elections